Bede Sixth Form College is a further education sixth-form college, based in Billingham, County Durham, England. The college provides A-Level, vocational courses, apprenticeship training, and higher education courses. It is a TASS accredited college, with a dedicated sports centre situated on its site.

It was established in 1972, following a reorganisation of various schools on the Billingham Campus site. The college took its name from the famous Northumbrian scholar The Venerable Bede. It merged with Stockton Riverside College in May 2008. The college group now also includes Redcar and Cleveland College, NETA Training and The Skills Academy, it is known as the Education Training Collective (Etc.).

History
The first hall had been built in 1958. It included a five form-entry co-educational grammar-technical school, Bede Hall Grammar School (which included a sixth form), and 3 secondary modern schools 'Faraday Hall', 'Davy Hall' and 'Stephenson Hall'(an older school on Hale Road Billingham). In 1965 it was agreed to combine the whole site into one comprehensive school which took place in the early 1970s. Bede Hall Grammar school was renamed Brunner school but would later be demolished. The older building 'Stephenson Hall' became 'Bede 6th Form college'. Brunner Hall, Faraday Hall and Davy Hall became Billingham Campus, an 11-16 comprehensive school.

Sixth form college
Bede Sixth Form College left Cleveland County Council control on 1 April 1993, and was funded by the Further Education Funding Council for England until 2001 when funded by North East LSC. It merged with Stockton Riverside College in May 2008. The new buildings and sport centre were built by Morgan Ashurst, who won the contract in July 2008 and was officially opened in 2009.

Activities
The Bede College Choir sang "Dear Lord and Father of Mankind" in the film Atonement, which won an Academy Award for Best Original Music Score in 2007.

Courses

AS and A level
A level and A level equivalent courses include:

 Applied Law
Applied Science
Art & Design
Biology
Business Studies
Chemistry
Classical Civilisation
Computer Science
Creative Media Production
Criminology
Economics
English Language
English Literature
Film Studies
Further Mathematics
Geography
Government & Politics
Health & Social Care
History
Law
Mathematics
Media Studies
Music Technology
Performing Arts
Photography
Physics
Psychology
Religion, Philosophy and Ethics
Sociology
Sport & Exercise Science

Full-time vocational courses
 Public Services
Sport & Exercise Science

Notable alumni
The following list is of notable ex pupils:
Matt Cowley – Professional Drummer.
Heather Black – Prominent member of the RAF Skeleton Association

References

External links

 Bede Sixth Form homepage at Stockton Riverside College

 September 2007 Consultation document about 2008 merger
 Morgan Ashurst new building
 college49

Educational institutions established in 1962
Educational institutions disestablished in 2008
Education in the Borough of Stockton-on-Tees
1962 establishments in England
2008 disestablishments in England
Billingham